The 2009 FIVB Volleyball World League was the 20th edition of the annual men's international volleyball tournament, played by 16 countries from 12 June to 26 July 2009. The Final Round was held in Belgrade, Serbia.

Pools composition

Pool standing procedure
 Match points
 Number of matches won
 Points ratio
 Sets ratio
 Result of the last match between the tied teams

Match won 3–0 or 3–1: 3 match points for the winner, 0 match points for the loser
Match won 3–2: 2 match points for the winner, 1 match point for the loser

Intercontinental round
All times are local.
The Final Round hosts Serbia, the winners of each pool and the best second among Pool A, C and D will qualify for the Final Round. If Serbia are ranked first in Pool B, the team ranked second of Pool B will qualify for the Final Round.

Pool A

Week 1

Week 2

Week 3

Week 4

Week 5

Week 6

Pool B

Week 1

Week 2

Week 3

Week 4

Week 5

Week 6

Pool C

Week 1

Week 2

Week 3

Week 4

Week 5

Week 6

Pool D

Week 1

Week 2

Week 3

Week 4

Week 5

Week 6

Final round
Venue:  Belgrade Arena, Belgrade, Serbia
All times are Central European Summer Time (UTC+02:00).

Pool play

Pool E

Pool F

Final four

Semifinals

3rd place match

Final

Final standing

Awards

Most Valuable Player
  Sérgio Santos
Best Scorer
  Ivan Miljković
Best Spiker
  Robertlandy Simón
Best Blocker
  Robertlandy Simón
Best Server
  Wilfredo León
Best Setter
  Nikola Grbić
Best Libero
  Aleksey Verbov

External links
Official website
Final Standing

FIVB Volleyball World League
FIVB World League
2009 in Serbian sport
International sports competitions in Belgrade
June 2009 sports events in Europe
2000s in Belgrade
July 2009 sports events in Europe